Mount Wister is located in the Teton Range, Grand Teton National Park, in the U.S. state of Wyoming.

The mountain is named after famed author Owen Wister, an early visitor to the area. Mount Wister was first climbed by Phil Smith in 1928.

References

Wister
Wister
Wister